Jack Harte may refer to:

Jack Harte (writer), Irish short story writer and novelist
Jack Harte (politician) (1920–2015), Irish Labour party politician and senator

See also
John Harte (disambiguation)
Jack Hart (disambiguation)